The 2018 Copa Sudamericana final stages were played from 21 August to 12 December 2018. A total of 16 teams competed in the final stages to decide the champions of the 2018 Copa Sudamericana.

Qualified teams
The 16 winners of the second stage advanced to the round of 16.

Seeding

Starting from the round of 16, the teams were seeded according to the second stage draw, with each team assigned a "seed" 1–16 corresponding to the tie they win (O1–O16) (Regulations Article 22.c).

Format

Starting from the round of 16, the teams played a single-elimination tournament with the following rules:
Each tie was played on a home-and-away two-legged basis, with the higher-seeded team hosting the second leg (Regulations Article 22.d).
In the round of 16, quarterfinals, and semifinals, if tied on aggregate, the away goals rule would be used. If still tied, extra time would not be played, and the penalty shoot-out would be used to determine the winner (Regulations Article 27).
In the finals, if tied on aggregate, the away goals rule would not be used, and 30 minutes of extra time would be played. If still tied after extra time, the penalty shoot-out would be used to determine the winner (Regulations Article 28).

Bracket
The bracket starting from the round of 16 was determined as follows:

The bracket was decided based on the second stage draw, which was held on 4 June 2018.

Round of 16
The first legs were played on 21–22 August, 18–20 and 26 September, and the second legs were played on 19, 25, 27 September, and 2–4 October 2018.

|}

Match A

Tied 0–0 on aggregate, Santa Fe won on penalties and advanced to the quarterfinals (Match S1).

Match B

Tied 3–3 on aggregate, Bahia won on penalties and advanced to the quarterfinals (Match S2).

Match C

Tied 3–3 on aggregate, Nacional won on away goals and advanced to the quarterfinals (Match S3).

Match D

Junior won 2–1 on aggregate and advanced to the quarterfinals (Match S4).

Match E

Defensa y Justicia won 2–0 on aggregate and advanced to the quarterfinals (Match S4).

Match F

Fluminense won 4–0 on aggregate and advanced to the quarterfinals (Match S3).

Match G

Atlético Paranaense won 4–1 on aggregate and advanced to the quarterfinals (Match S2).

Match H

Tied 1–1 on aggregate, Deportivo Cali won on penalties and advanced to the quarterfinals (Match S1).

Quarterfinals
The first legs were played on 23–25 October, and the second legs were played on 30–31 October and 1 November 2018.

|}

Match S1

Santa Fe won 3–2 on aggregate and advanced to the semifinals (Match F1).

Match S2

Tied 1–1 on aggregate, Atlético Paranaense won on penalties and advanced to the semifinals (Match F2).

Match S3

Fluminense won 2–1 on aggregate and advanced to the semifinals (Match F2).

Match S4

Tied 3–3 on aggregate, Junior won on away goals and advanced to the semifinals (Match F1).

Semifinals
The first legs were played on 7–8 November, and the second legs were played on 28–29 November 2018.

|}

Match F1

Junior won 3–0 on aggregate and advanced to the finals.

Match F2

Atlético Paranaense won 4–0 on aggregate and advanced to the finals.

Finals

In the finals, if tied on aggregate, the away goals rule would not be used, and 30 minutes of extra time would be played. If still tied after extra time, the penalty shoot-out would be used to determine the winner (Regulations Article 28).

The first leg was played on 5 December, and the second leg was played on 12 December 2018.

Tied 2–2 on aggregate, Atlético Paranaense won on penalties.

Notes

References

External links
CONMEBOL Sudamericana 2018, CONMEBOL.com

3
August 2018 sports events in South America
September 2018 sports events in South America
October 2018 sports events in South America
November 2018 sports events in South America
December 2018 sports events in South America